Polytechnic University of the Philippines, Biñan, or PUP Biñan is a PUP campus located in the city of Biñan, Laguna, Philippines, offering eleven (1) course, one (3) diploma program and undergraduate programs.

The campus was created through a memorandum of agreement between the university and the city government of Biñan in 2010.

Courses
College of Accountancy (COA)
 Bachelor of Science in Accountancy (BSA)

College of Computer Management and Information Technology (CCMIT)
 Bachelor of Science in Information Technology (BSIT)

College of Engineering (CE)
 Bachelor of Science in Computer Engineering (BSCoE)
 Bachelor of Science in Industrial Engineering (BSIE)

College of Technology (CT)
 Diploma in Office Management Technology (DOMT)
 Diploma in Computer Engineering Management Technology (DCEMT)
 Diploma in Information Communication Management Technology (DICMT)

College of Business Administration (CBA)
 Bachelor of Science in Business Administration major in Human Resource Management Development (BSBA-HRDM)

External links
 Polytechnic University of the Philippines Official Website

Polytechnic University of the Philippines
2010 establishments in the Philippines
Universities and colleges in Laguna (province)
Education in Biñan
Educational institutions established in 2010